Prince Eugenio of Savoy, 5th Duke of Genoa (Eugenio Alfonso Carlo Maria Giuseppe; 13 March 1906 – 8 December 1996) was a member of the House of Savoy, Duke of Ancona from birth, and the 5th and final Duke of Genoa. Prince Eugenio was the sixth and youngest child of Prince Thomas of Savoy, 2nd Duke of Genoa and his wife Princess Isabella of Bavaria.

Marriage and issue
Prince Eugenio married Princess Lucia of the Two Sicilies, fifth child and fourth-eldest daughter of Prince Ferdinand Pius of the Two Sicilies, Duke of Calabria and his wife Princess Maria Ludwiga Theresia of Bavaria, on 29 October 1938 at Nymphenburg Palace in Munich, Germany. The bride and groom were second cousins once removed in descent from King Ludwig I of Bavaria.  Prince Eugenio and Princess Lucia had one daughter:

Princess Maria Isabella Elena Immacolata Barbara Anna Pace of Savoy-Genoa (born 23 June 1943 in Rome), married on 29 April 1971 in Lausanne, Alberto Frioli dei Conti di Rezzano (born 7 April 1943 in Rimini), son of Guido Frioli, Count of Rezzano, and Vittoria Fabbri. They have four children.

Later life
After the dissolution of the Kingdom of Italy in 1946, Prince Eugenio and his family relocated to Brazil where the Duke ran a farm. Upon his death on 8 December 1996, the male line of the Genoa branch of the House of Savoy became extinct as did the Royal Dukedom of Genoa. In 2006, the ashes of the Duke and Duchess of Genoa were transferred to the Royal Crypt of Superga near Turin.

Honours

Knight of the Supreme Order of the Most Holy Annunciation
Knight of the Order of Saints Maurice and Lazarus
 Knight Grand Cross of Justice of the Sacred Military Constantinian Order of Saint George
 Knight of Honor and Devotion of the Sovereign Military Hospitaller Order of Saint John of Jerusalem, of Rhodes and of Malta
 Knight of the Order of Saint Hubert

Ancestry

References

1906 births
1996 deaths
Princes of Savoy
Italian emigrants to Brazil
Dukes of Genoa
Nobility from Turin
Italian Roman Catholics
Burials at the Basilica of Superga
Royal reburials